O Pioneers! is an American opera in two acts by composer Barbara Harbach, set to a libretto by Jonathan Yordy. It is based on the 1913 novel by Willa Cather. Harbach became enamored with Willa Cather's works when commissioned by the Central Wisconsin Symphony Orchestra to write a symphony based on Cather's 1922 novel One of Ours. When given the opportunity to compose an opera, she chose O Pioneers! because she has "always been drawn to stories about strong women." Harbach adds that Cather's story "has all the elements that an opera needs: long-term loving relationships, sibling rivalry and murder." 

Harbach composed O Pioneers! over a period from February 2008 to May 2009. She rendered the orchestration entirely on a computer. During the world premiere production's rehearsal period (late September to early October 2009), she made cuts to the piece for length, and added necessary interludes for scene changes and preludes before each Act.

St. Louis world premiere
The world premiere of O Pioneers! took place on October 9, 2009 at the Blanche M. Touhill Performing Arts Center on the campus of University of Missouri-St. Louis in a staging by the Chicago-based director Mark Meier. Scott Schoonover of Union Avenue Opera served as Artistic Director and Conductor. The production crew included designers Patrick Huber (scenic), Felia Katherine Davenport (costumes), Kimberly Klearman (lighting), property master Douglas Allebach, set builder Bryan Schulte, répétiteur Vera Parkin and stage manager Allyson Ditchey. The production was the result of a partnership developed by UMSL's College of Fine Arts and Communication, St. Louis Women's Chorale, Dimensions Dance Center and the Women In the Arts Initiative, an endowment begun in 2004 by composer Harbach and Thomas George (Chancellor of UMSL) to support women artists.

On December 5, 2009, a live recording of the world premiere production, recorded and mastered by Jeff Griswold, was broadcast on Classic 99 KFUO-FM in St. Louis as part of its weekly program Saturday Afternoon at the Opera.

Critical reception
Bridget Ryder of The Current (the University student newspaper): 

"[T]he opera's development of the two main characters and insight into their inner struggle, combined with acting that plied the depth of both characters, brought the show to life.
...
"The performance built energy throughout, the characters becoming more complicated as their inner and outer struggles became more entangled by illicit love relationships, family feuds and eventually murder."
...
"The contrasting temperaments of Marie and Alexandra, a kind of sense-and-sensibility combination, provided changes in tone and a study in personality that made 'O Pioneers!' more dramatic and interesting than perhaps would be thought possible on a Nebraska farm."

Libretto
Jonathan Yordy’s libretto draws upon plot events from Parts II, IV and V of the novel. As such, the opera begins when the main characters Alexandra Bergson, Emil Bergson, Carl Linstrum and Marie Shabata are all grown into adulthood.  Several secondary and minor characters from the novel are not present, but the libretto includes the characters of Ivar, Frank Shabata, Amédée Chevalier, Angelique Chevalier and Alexandra’s brothers: Oscar and Lou.  A choral ensemble of Nebraskan farmers and townspeople also appears in the opera.

Premiere cast

Characters

Alexandra Bergson
A pioneer farmer, strong and highly intelligent. After the father dies, the family works hard and finally becomes prosperous under Alexandra's direction. Her life is one of work and resolve. When childhood friend Carl Linstrum returns for a visit, she overcomes her natural reserve as the friendship slowly blossoms into love.

Emil Bergson
The youngest son of the Bergson family, but more accustomed to the wealth of the later years than to the earlier hardscrabble life on the farm. He finds a year in Mexico has done nothing to diminish his ardor for unhappily married Marie, the love of his childhood.

Carl Linstrum
Former neighbor of the Bergson's. After living out East for a number of years, returns West to visit his childhood home and seek his fortune in Alaska.

Marie Shabata
A lively and free-spirited beauty of Bohemian descent. Now married to Frank Shabata and living on lands adjacent to Alexandra's.

Frank Shabata
Marie's short-tempered husband. Something of a dandy when he married Marie, his life is now focused on wringing a meager existence from a stubborn, unyielding homestead.

Lou and Oscar Bergson
The two remaining brothers of Emil and Alexandra. More brawny than brainy. Quick to anger and take offense. Suspicious of outsiders.

Ivar
A simple Norwegian. Man of the earth, in tune with nature and its seasons. A water witch, devout, pacifist, and lover of all things living.

Amédée Chevalier
Emil's closest friend. A wealthy French farmer with a large, successful operation. Marrying his pretty bride Angelique.

Synopsis

Place: Red Cloud, Nebraska.
Time: 1910.

Act One
Returning from Mexico for a wedding, Emil finds himself drawn to a sheltered orchard where his childhood sweetheart, Marie—now married—awaits. The bond between them is rekindled, and escalates into a clandestine passion. Emil's sister, Alexandra, a wealthy farmer and landowner, suspects but refuses to believe the worst. Her attentions are on Carl, a childhood friend who has returned from the East.  Their friendship blossoms into love, amid family tensions over wealth, ownership, and the proper role of women.

These conflicts also bear upon Ivar, a rough seer who advises Alexandra on agricultural matters and offers periodic commentary on events as they unfold.

Things come to a head as the farmers and townsfolk gather for the Church fair. Carl decides to head west to Alaska after several unpleasant confrontations with Alexandra's brothers Oscar and Lou.  Emil and Marie rush headlong into a barely hidden embrace.

Act Two
It is now harvest-time, and hard work, camaraderie, and community are the order of the day. Emil and Marie participate, but are under increasing strain as they contemplate what the future holds. Fate intervenes with a death—newly married Amédée, cut down in the fullness of his happiness. Emil and Marie are devastated, and cling passionately to each other in their need. Marie's husband Frank, in a drunken jealous rage, grabs his rifle and stumbles to the orchard. Seeing the couple lying in the grass, he blindly shoots, killing them both.

Their deaths stun the community, and Alexandra is numb with grievous shock. She buries them and mourns and tries to understand the wreckage. Carl eventually returns after having heard news of the tragedy and subsequent trial, and he and Alexandra begin a life of tenderness and measured happiness.

References

Operas set in the United States
English-language operas
2009 operas
Operas based on novels
Willa Cather
Operas